This is a list of libraries in Cuba. There  are more than 400 public libraries in Cuba.

Libraries in Cuba 

 National Library José Martí
 Municipal Library Alejo Carpentier
 Municipal Library Antonio José Oviedo
 Municipal Library Camilo Cienfuegos
 Municipal Library Hermanos Saíz
 Municipal Library January 28
 Municipal Library Julio Rosas
 Municipal Library Nena Villegas
 Municipal Library Raúl Gómez García

See also 

 List of archives in Cuba
 List of museums in Cuba
 Culture of Cuba

References 

Cuba education-related lists
 
Cuba
Libraries